Olancho Fútbol Club, previously known as C.D. Alianza Becerra, is a Honduran professional football club based in Juticalpa, Olancho, Honduras, that competes in the Liga Nacional de Fútbol Profesional de Honduras.

History
Founded in 2010 as C.D. Alianza Becerra.  In 2011, Alianza won promotion to the Honduran second division after beating Mar Azul in the final of the Inter-Regional Centro Sur Oriente championship.  In August 2016, the club was re-branded as Olancho F.C. and moved from San Francisco de Becerra to Juticalpa.

Honours
 Liga de Ascenso
 Winners (2): 2015–16 C, 2018–19 C

Players

Current squad

Managers
  Miguel Palacios (2012)
  Hernaín Arzú (2012)
   Jonny Fajardo (2016)

References

Olancho F.C.